Karun Gurung  is a Bhutanese former international football and futsal player, and current coach. He made his first appearance for the Bhutan national football team in 2009.

References

Living people
1986 births
Bhutanese footballers
Bhutanese people of Nepalese descent
Bhutan international footballers
Association football midfielders